Poland national field hockey team may refer to:
 Poland men's national field hockey team
 Poland women's national field hockey team